Basel Samih Zaidan (born 17 June 1981) is a Qatari  footballer who is a goalkeeper.

Samih played for Umm Salal in the 2007 AFC Champions League. He also appeared for Qatar in an unofficial match at the 2002 West Asian Games.

Club career statistics
Statistics accurate as of 21 August 2011

1Includes Emir of Qatar Cup.
2Includes Sheikh Jassem Cup.
3Includes AFC Champions League.

References

External links
Fussballtransfers.com 

1981 births
Living people
Qatari footballers
Al Sadd SC players
Al-Arabi SC (Qatar) players
Al-Khor SC players
Al Ahli SC (Doha) players
El Jaish SC players
Mesaimeer SC players
Muaither SC players
Umm Salal SC players
Al-Markhiya SC players
Qatar Stars League players
Association football goalkeepers
Footballers at the 2002 Asian Games
Qatari people of Jordanian descent
Naturalised citizens of Qatar
Asian Games competitors for Qatar